In art history, the French term objet d’art describes an ornamental work of art, and the term objets d’art describes a range of works of art, usually small and three-dimensional, made of high-quality materials, and a finely-rendered finish that emphasises the aesthetics of the artefact. Artists create and produce objets d’art in the fields of the decorative arts and metalwork, porcelain and vitreous enamel; figurines, plaquettes, and engraved gems; ivory carvings and semi-precious hardstone carvings; tapestries, antiques, and antiquities; and books with fine bookbinding.

The National Maritime Museum, Greenwich, London, describe their accumulated artworks as a: "collection of objets d’art [which] comprises over 800 objects. These are mostly small, decorative art items that fall outside the scope of the Museum’s ceramic, plate, textiles and glass collections." The artwork collection also includes metal curtain ties, a lacquered papier-maché tray, tobacco boxes, cigarette cases, découpage (cut-paper items), portrait miniatures, a gilt-brass clock finial, plaques, statuettes, plaquettes, a horse brass, a metal pipe tamper, a small glass painting, et cetera.

Objet de vertu

The objet de vertu, wherein vertu suggests rich materials and a higher standard of refined manufacture and finish; the classification usually excludes objects made for realising a practical function. As works of art, objets de vertu reflect the rarified aesthetic and conspicuous consumption characteristic of an aristocratic court — of the late-medieval Burgundian dukes, the Mughal emperors, or Ming China — such as the Lycurgus Cup, which is a cage cup made of Roman glass; the Byzantine agate "Rubens vase"; the Roman glass "Portland Vase", and onyx and chalcedony cameo carvings, whilst the pre–World War I production of objets d'art featured Fabergé eggs made of precious metals and decorated with gemstones.

A comparable term that appears in 18th- and 19th-century French sale catalogs, though now less used, is objets de curiosité, "objects of curiosity", now devolved into the less-valued curio.  Elaborate late Renaissance display pieces in silver that incorporate organic elements such as ostrich eggs, nuts of the coco de mer and sea-shells are grouped in a volume, published in 1991, as "The Curiousities" in the catalogues of the Waddesdon Bequest at the British Museum.

Images

See also

Treasury
Cabinet of curiosities

References

Decorative arts